William Gillan Waddell (21 April 1884 – 25 January 1945) was a Scottish Professor of Classics at what is now Cairo University.

Life 
Waddell was born in Neilston, Scotland. In 1906 he obtained his M.A. from the University of Glasgow. He was Professor of Classics at Fuad el Awal University in Cairo, Egypt (in 1940). Waddell was a translator of ancient Greek and Latin into English.

Selected works

References 

1884 births
1945 deaths
Academic staff of Cairo University
Scottish translators
20th-century translators
British expatriates in Egypt